Bartolomé Martínez González (24 August 1873 in Jinotega – 30 January 1936 in Matagalpa) was Nicaraguan politician from the Conservative Party. He served as Vice President of Nicaragua from January 1921 to October 1923. After the death of Diego Manuel Chamorro, and after a brief period of 15 days where the Interior Minister, Rosendo Chamorro Oreamuno held office, while waiting for Martínez to return to the capital, he was sworn in to serve the remainder of Chamorro's term as President of Nicaragua from 27 October 1923 to 1 January 1925.

In a short time he recovered on behalf of the national government the Customs Office, the Central Bank and the Railroad of Nicaragua, which were in the hands of the American bankers Brown and Seligman. He formed a National Government, including the Liberals.

References

1873 births
1936 deaths
People from Jinotega Department
Conservative Party (Nicaragua) politicians
Presidents of Nicaragua
Vice presidents of Nicaragua